Ratatouille (Original Motion Picture Soundtrack) is the soundtrack album to the computer-animated comedy film of the same name from the production of Pixar Animation Studios and Walt Disney Pictures, directed by Brad Bird and featured musical score composed by Michael Giacchino. The film marked Giacchino's second Pixar film after The Incredibles, which was also directed by Bird and also the second Pixar film not to be scored by Randy Newman or Thomas Newman. The album features original score cues, with an original song "Le Festin" written by Giacchino and performed by Camile, and was released by Walt Disney Records on June 26, 2007. 

The score featured a diverse collection of influences of music genres: European romanticism, quasi-classical, folk-pop and traditional elements of Parisian cafe sounds. The music received critical acclaim, praising it as one of Giacchino's best score in his career, and gave his first Academy Award nomination for Best Original Score, though losing to Atonement. However, Giacchino won the Annie Award for Best Music in a Feature Production, and his first Grammy Award for Best Score Soundtrack Album. Giacchino returned to Pixar to score their 2009 blockbuster Up. A remastered double LP was released by Mondo, 10 years after the film's release in November 2017.

Development 
Giacchino had written two themes for Remy, one about him with the rat colony and the other about his hopes and dreams. He also wrote a buddy theme for both Remy and Linguini that plays when they are together. Giacchino stated that Bird wanted him to "exapress the taste of food with music" and doing the same with visuals. While writing the score, he had to find the elements of Paris in the film and also to create music out of the city as was the story. Hence, several scores were created for the characters and their emotions, as the setting "needed a broader scope". A wide range of instruments (accordion, violin, jazz guitar, clarinet, piano amongst others) were used. The score was produced and recorded at Sony Pictures Studios, Culver City, CA. 

According to Entertainment Weekly, Giacchino said that "the film was different from scene to scene. When you go see a movie about rats, you’re thinking it’s going to be funny and slapstick — but this is an extremely emotional movie". In addition to the score, Giacchino wrote the main theme song, "Le Festin", about Remy and his dream to be a chef. Though Bird's initial films were not song-oriented, the necessity to include an original song was "to do something different and special", according to Giacchino. The song was the first cue he written for the film. French artist Camille (who was 29 at the time of the film's release) was hired to perform "Le Festin" after Giacchino listened to her music and realized she was perfect for the song; as a result, the song is sung in French in almost all versions of the film. The song was recorded in Vancouver.

In October 2015, coinciding Ratatouille's premiere at the Royal Albert Hall, London, Giacchino conducted a live orchestral performance at the venue, which received widespread acclaim. Giacchino's themes were partly used in the unofficial musical performed by TikTok users through crowdfunding in November 2020, and new songs were performed by the cast.

Track listing 
All music/tracks composed and performed by Michael Giacchino, except where noted.

Reception 
The soundtrack received critical acclaim, with Empire magazine called the score as one of "Giacchino's best" and further added "Certainly, there’s a heavy dose of predictability here given its use of practically every French music cliché there is (albeit rendered in a stylish jazz/waltz/salsa style), but the sheer verve, infectiously upbeat tone and creative use of special instrumentation swiftly renders that criticism moot - it’s never less than utterly enjoyable." James Christopher Monger of AllMusic called it as a "lively and endlessly inventive soundtrack that strikes a perfect balance between the old European drama of Ennio Morricone and the unhinged whimsy of Raymond Scott". He further wrote, " Like an Old World version of Giacchino's jazz-infused, comic-book-kissed score for The Incredibles, Ratatouille is both elegant and mad, built around a sweet and playful theme called "Le Festin," which is presented both instrumentally and vocally (sung by the charming French star Camille) and is as timeless as the dish for which the film is based."

Accolades 
Giacchino's score for Ratatouille was nominated for the Best Original Score category at the 80th Academy Awards, but lost to Dario Marianelli for his work in Atonement. However, he won the Annie Award for Best Music in an Animated Feature Production and Grammy Award for Best Score Soundtrack for Visual Media.

References 

2007 soundtrack albums
Ratatouille (film)
Pixar soundtracks
Walt Disney Records soundtracks
Michael Giacchino soundtracks
Animated film soundtracks
Grammy Award for Best Score Soundtrack for Visual Media